The 2012 Mercure Perth Masters were held from January 5 to 8 at the Dewars Centre in Perth, Scotland as part of the 2011–12 World Curling Tour. The purse for the event was GBP£17,000, and the winner, Mike McEwen, received GBP£6,000. The event was held in a triple knockout format. 

For the first time, a spot in the Masters was awarded to the winner of the 2011 Curl Atlantic Championship, James Grattan of New Brunswick, Canada.

Teams

Knockout results

A event

B event

C event

Playoffs

References

External links

Mercure Perth Masters
Mercure Perth Masters
Scottish Men's Curling Championship|Mercure Perth Masters
Mercure Perth Masters